Gentle Giant were a British progressive rock band from 1970 to 1980. 

Gentle Giant may also refer to:

In music
 Gentle Giant (album), the band's 1970 debut album
 The Gentle Giant, a 1972 album by Yusef Lateef
 Gentle Giant, a 2009 EP and song on the EP by The Nobility
 "Gentle Giant (for Hank)", a track on the 2010 album Let's Touch the Sky by the jazz group Fourplay

Mountains
 Mount Elbert, highest summit of the Rocky Mountains, called the "gentle giant"
 Mount Moosilauke, New Hampshire, sometimes referred to as the "Gentle Giant"

People
 Claude Coats (1913–1992), American artist, animator and set designer associated with Disney
 Mal Evans (1935–1976), road manager, assistant and friend of the Beatles
 Manuel Martínez Gutiérrez (born 1974), Spanish retired shot putter
 Geoff Leek (1932–2008), Australian rules footballer
 Stuart S. Murray (1898–1980), US Navy vice admiral
 Günter Schlierkamp (born 1970), German retired professional bodybuilder
 Lee Roy Selmon (1954–2011), American National Football League player
 Lacina Traoré (born 1990), footballer from Ivory Coast
 Robert Wadlow (1918–1940), tallest person in history for whom there is irrefutable evidence
 Don Williams (1939–2017), American singer and songwriter nicknamed the "Gentle Giant" of country music
 Arthur Wint (1920–1992), Jamaican middle-distance runner and first Jamaican Olympic champion

Other uses
 Gentle Giant (film), a 1967 film about a boy and his pet bear
 Gentle Giant Moving Company, a national American moving company
 nickname of the Flemish Giant rabbit, a breed of domestic rabbit

See also
 John Charles (1931–2004), Welsh footballer nicknamed "Il Gigante Buono" ("The Gentle Giant") while playing in Italy
 Contrabass flute and Subcontrabass flute, both sometimes called the "gentle giant" of the flute family

Lists of people by nickname